Alexandre Julien Savérien (16 July 1720 – 3 May 1805) was a French mathematician.

Works

External links
 

1720 births
1805 deaths
18th-century French writers
18th-century French male writers
18th-century French mathematicians
People from Arles